Air traffic management (ATM) is an aviation term encompassing all systems that assist aircraft to depart from an aerodrome, transit airspace, and land at a destination aerodrome, consisting of air traffic services (ATS) including air traffic control (ATC),, airspace management (ASM), and air traffic flow and capacity management (ATFCM).

The increasing emphasis of modern ATM is on interoperable and harmonised systems that allow an aircraft to operate with the minimum of performance change from one airspace to another. ATC systems have traditionally been developed by individual States that concentrated on their own requirements, creating different levels of service and capability around the world. Many Air Navigation Service Providers (ANSPs) do not provide an ATC service that matches the capabilities of modern aircraft, so ICAO has developed the Aviation System Block Upgrade (ASBU) initiative in order to harmonise global planning of technology upgrades.

In the Asia/Pacific Region, the ICAO Regional Office in Bangkok, Thailand is developing a Seamless ATM Plan, which is intended to set expectations for ATM upgrades in the world's busiest aviation region in terms of Revenue Passenger Kilometres. The Seamless ATM Plan is expected to be approved by the Asia/Pacific Air Navigation Planning and Implementation Regional Group (APANPIRG) in mid-2013.

See also 

 Air Traffic Control

References